The 27th edition of the Vuelta Ciclista de Chile was held from March 11 to March 21, 2004.

Stages

2004-03-11: Lota — Concepción (35 km)

2004-03-12: Concepción — Chillán (117 km)

2004-03-13: San Nicolás — Talca (197 km)

2004-03-14: Talca — Curepto (77 km)

2004-03-14: Hualañé — Curicó (90 km)

2004-03-15: Curicó — Pichilemu (150 km)

2004-03-16: Cruce La Rosa — La Estrella (21 km)

2004-03-16: La Estrella — Algarrobo (146 km)

2004-03-17: Algarrobo — Villa Alemana (105 km)

2004-03-18: Olmué — Los Andes (122 km)

2004-03-19: Los Andes — Portillo (115 km)

2004-03-20: Pirque — Pirque (131 km)

2004-03-21: Santiago — Santiago (60 km)

Final classification

Teams 

Publiguías

Ace Bryc Curicó

Skippi – Doñihue

Kazachstan National Team

Comunidad Valenciana-Kelme

L.A Pecol

Lascar-Peñaflor

Líder-La Polar

Miche

Multihogar Curicó

Orbitel Colombia

Quinta Normal

Uruguay National Team

Transportes Romero

UPMC American Cycling Team

Nacimiento

Asociación de Concepción

References 
 cyclingnews
 Overview

Vuelta Ciclista de Chile
Chile
Vuelta Ciclista
March 2004 sports events in South America